The Sallie House is located in Atchison, Kansas. Built in the mid-1800s, it is said to be haunted by the ghost of a young girl who died in the house while undergoing surgery for appendicitis. The story gained national attention after it was featured on several paranormal television shows.

History 
The Sallie House was built in the mid-1800s, commissioned by the Finney family and home to Dr. Charles Finney. He practiced medicine from the house, using the bottom floor for surgery and examination, and a bedroom as an office. The Finney family lived upstairs until moving out due to a lack of space.

The house was listed on the real estate website Zillow for $1 million in February 2016, dropped to $499,000 in August, and taken off market in November 2017.

Haunting 
The Sallie House is reported to be haunted by the ghost of a young girl who died there. According to the legend, a child named Sallie was brought to Dr. Finney's house by her mother for severe abdominal pain. He thought that she had appendicitis and began emergency surgery, as he believed that Sallie's appendix was about to rupture. However, he cut into her before the anaesthetic took effect, killing her as a result.

Multiple former tenants have alleged paranormal activity there. It has been especially reported by male residents and visitors, some of whom have claimed to have been scratched until they bled, which has led to Sallie being dubbed "The Man Hating Ghost".

In the 1990s, the house was featured on the paranormal investigations television show Sightings. On January 17, 2015, it appeared on an episode of the Travel Channel series Ghost Adventures.

References

External link 
Sallie House Full Length Documentary

Reportedly haunted locations in the United States
Houses in Atchison County, Kansas
1800s